Subhash Maharia (born 29 September 1957) was a union minister of state, rural development in Government of India. He was minister from 1999 to 2004. He was a leader of Bharatiya Janta Party and was a member of 12th, 13th and 14th Lok Sabha from Sikar in Rajasthan now, he is a leader of Indian National Congress from November 2016.

He was born on 29 September 1957 in village Kudan in the Lakshmangarh Sikar District, Rajasthan in the family of Brijmohan Maharia. He graduated from S.K. College in Sikar. He is an athlete and represented his state and university in many national competitions. He married Sushma Maharia on 12 December 1980. They have a son and a daughter.

Join Congress
The two Jat leaders, who switched to the Indian National Congress (on 1 November 2016), are former Union Minister Subhash Maharia and former MP Hari Singh.
Maharia, a three-time MP and a minister in the Atal Bihari Vajpayee government, is a prominent Jat leader and was once the national vice president of BJP Kisan Morcha.

Positions held
1998: Elected to 12th Lok Sabha
1998 - 1999: Member, Committee on Urban and Rural Development and its Sub-Committee-II on Ministry of Rural Areas and Employment.  Member, Joint Committee on the Functioning of Wakf Boards, Member, Consultative Committee, Ministry of Tourism
1999: Re-elected to 13th Lok Sabha (second term)
1999–2004: Union Minister of State, Rural Development
2004: Re-elected to 14th Lok Sabha (3rd term)
2010: Member B.J.P. National Executive
2011: National Vice President BJP Kisan Morcha.

Others activities
Patron : All India Budokan Karate Federation ;
Member, B.J.P. Election Committee, Rajasthan, since 1998 ;
President - District Sahakari Sangh, Sikar; 
Secretary, Industries Association, Rajasthan;

Profession :  Agriculturist, Political - Social Worker and Industrialist. He has widely visited countries like Singapore, Thailand and Malaysia as a representative of Eicher Tractors Ltd. in August 1986. He also led the Indian Delegation to ASIAN COUNTRIES SUMMIT to Cambodia, Sri Lanka, etc. during his tenure as Union minister of GOVT OF INDIA (1999–2004). Mr.Maharia also addressed United Nations General Assembly in New York, U.S.A. in October 2007 as a member of Indian delegation to United Nations.

Sports and clubs
Table tennis; President, Zila Olympic Sangh, Sikar; Vice-President, Rajasthan Olympic Association; represented Rajasthan in National Athletics; won, (i) Silver Medal in 800 metre race; and (ii) Gold Medal in Rural National Games; Best Athlete in school games, 1975–76; First position holder in 400 and 800 metre race in University of Rajasthan, 1977, 1978 and 1979; represented Rajasthan at Inter University-Athletic Meets, 1977, 1978 and 1979 .

References

External links 

1957 births
Rajasthani politicians
Rajasthani people
Bharatiya Janata Party politicians from Rajasthan
Living people
University of Rajasthan alumni
India MPs 2004–2009
People from Sikar
India MPs 1998–1999
India MPs 1999–2004
Lok Sabha members from Rajasthan